On May 31, 1952, Peru received a formal invitation to participate in the first Miss Universe pageant, which was held on June 28 that year at the Long Beach Municipal Auditorium in Long Beach, California, United States.  Immediately the National Committee made a press conference to choose candidates from different districts, cities and regions of Peru in a week. The Special Awards were chosen on the Preliminary show, on June 3, from Biarritz Theatre.

The Miss Perú 1952 pageant was held on June 7, 1952. Seventeen candidates competed for the national crown. The winner represented Peru at the Miss Universe 1952.

Placements

Special Awards

 Miss Photogenic - Callao - Gabriella García-Arrese (voted by press reporters)
 Miss Congeniality - Pisco - Herminia Roldán
 Miss Elegance - Andahuaylas - Beatriz Jerí

.

Delegates

Áncash - Lucila Cristiana Florian
Andahuaylas - Beatriz Jerí
Apurímac - Ada Gabriela Bueno
Barranco - Melissa Mendez Rodena
Cajamarca - Elisa Castro
Callao - Gabriella García-Arrese
Chorrillos - Diana Beatriz Carozzi
Cuzco - Celia Velazco
Distrito Capital - Angelica Olazabal

Ica - Raquel Mercedes Uribe 
Lambayeque - Myriam Soriano
La Punta - Elisa Scheelje
Loreto - Dora Canales
Miraflores - Marcela Alvarado 
Pisco - Herminia Roldán
San Isidro - Gloria Sasin
Tumbes - Alida Farfan

.

References 

Miss Peru
1952 in Peru
1952 beauty pageants